
Gmina Chełmża is a rural gmina (administrative district) in Toruń County, Kuyavian-Pomeranian Voivodeship, in north-central Poland. Its seat is the town of Chełmża, although the town is not part of the territory of the gmina.

Villages
Gmina Chełmża contains the villages and settlements of Bielczyny, Bocień, Bogusławki, Brąchnówko, Browina, Drzonówko, Dziemiony, Dźwierzno, Głuchowo, Głuchowo-Windak, Grodno, Grzegorz, Grzywna, Januszewo, Kiełbasin, Kończewice, Kuczwały, Liznowo, Mirakowo, Morczyny, Nawra, Nowa Chełmża, Parowa Falęcka, Pluskowęsy, Skąpe, Sławkowo, Strużal, Świętosław, Szerokopas, Witkowo, Zajączkowo, Zalesie, Zelgno and Zelgno-Bezdół.

Neighbouring gminas
Gmina Chełmża is bordered by the town of Chełmża and by the gminas of Kijewo Królewskie, Kowalewo Pomorskie, Lisewo, Łubianka, Łysomice, Papowo Biskupie, Płużnica and Wąbrzeźno.

Gallery

External links
Polish official population figures 2006

Chelmza
Toruń County
Chełmża